In the field of pharmacology, potency is a measure of drug activity expressed in terms of the amount required to produce an effect of given intensity. A highly potent drug (e.g., fentanyl, alprazolam, risperidone, bumetanide, bisoprolol) evokes a given response at low concentrations, while a drug of lower potency (meperidine, diazepam, ziprasidone, furosemide, metoprolol) evokes the same response only at higher concentrations. Higher potency does not necessarily mean greater effectiveness or more side effects.

The IUPHAR has stated that 'potency' is "an imprecise term that should always be further defined", for instance as EC_{50}, IC_{50}, ED_{50}, LD_{50} and so on.

See also
 Reaction inhibitor § Potency

References

Further reading
 
 

Pharmacodynamics